Western Electric Company-Tarheel Army Missile Plant is an abandoned industrial complex located approximately two miles east of downtown Burlington's commercial district in Alamance County, North Carolina. Built in 1927, it is listed on the National Register of Historic Places.

History 
The Tarheel Army Missile Plant was constructed in 1927 as a synthetic fabric rayon manufacturing plant for the A.M. Johnson Rayon Mills, Inc. The company failed in marketing their rayon product to the textile weaving plants in the Burlington vicinity. As a result, the plant was renamed the Carolina Rayon Mills, Inc and a new management was brought in. But, this reorganization failed to improve the company's financial situation, and eventually the plant was closed in November 1931.

From 1931 until 1942, the plant remained mostly vacant. It was used for various short-term purposes, including tobacco warehousing and automobile storage.

But, during World War II, Detroit-based architect Albert Kahn's firm designed Building 4 to accommodate Fairchild Engine & Airplane Corporation manufacturing line to support war effort. 

After World War II, in 1958, the plant was leased to the Western Electric Company, for research, engineering, production, and refurbishment of missile systems and components. But, the plant was under the operational control of the US Army's MICOM , which used to be a major subcommand of DARCOM .

The whole complex is spread over a 32-acre site, and has 23 buildings that once provided approximately 700,000 square feet of usable manufacturing and assembly space. Currently, the complex houses Good Samaritan Super Thrift Store.

References 

Historic districts on the National Register of Historic Places in North Carolina
Buildings and structures in Burlington, North Carolina
National Register of Historic Places in Alamance County, North Carolina
Buildings and structures completed in 1927